Tito Junco (4 January 1944 – 15 August 2003) was a Cuban film actor. He appeared in 19 films and television shows between 1975 and 2003. In 1981 he won the award for Best Actor at the 12th Moscow International Film Festival for his role in Guardafronteras.

Selected filmography
 Guardafronteras (1981)

References

External links

1944 births
2003 deaths
Cuban male film actors
People from Havana
21st-century Cuban male actors
20th-century Cuban male actors